Robert Frederick McDermott (January 7, 1914 – October 3, 1963) was an American professional basketball player in the 1930s and 1940s. He was known as an outstanding shooter and has been called "the greatest long-distance shooter in the history of the game" by contemporaries. His grandson is businessman Bill McDermott. McDermott was named to the Naismith Memorial Basketball Hall of Fame in 1988.

Professional basketball career
McDermott dropped out of high school after just one year, and was picked up by the Brooklyn Visitations after making a name for himself on the playgrounds.  He continued the trend in the American Basketball League. He led the league in scoring, and helped Brooklyn win the 1934-35 ABL championship against the dominant Philadelphia Sphas in their prime. He spent a year in the New York Professional League where he set a playoff record for most points with 32. He played with the recently reorganized Original Celtics for the next three years.

He went back to the ABL and was again the league's scoring leader, returned to the Celtics for another season, then settled down for a while with the Ft. Wayne Zollner Pistons of the National Basketball League in 1941. From 1941 to 1946 he was at his peak. He improved his shot and for the first time, his free throw percentage rose near or around 80%. He continued to get more accurate and dangerous while keeping his legendary range.  The Pistons won over 80% of their games and made five consecutive NBL finals appearances.  They won NBL titles in 1944 and 1945, as well as the World Professional Basketball Tournament in Chicago. At the same time, his popularity soared, and he appeared at a war bond rally alongside Jack Dempsey and Martha Raye.

McDermott became a player-coach during 1946. He took up the same position when he moved to the Chicago Gears. On the Gears, he was teamed with the biggest inside threat in the league, George Mikan. They won the 1946-47 NBL championship together. Though he would continue to play professionally for several more years, McDermott's last year with the Gears was his final year of stardom on a winning team.

The American Gears joined the Professional Basketball League of America in 1947. But when that league folded in November 1947, after only three weeks of existence, the Gears players were distributed among NBL teams. McDermott landed with the Sheboygan Red Skins, with whom he was a player-coach for about a month. He scored 138 points in 16 games and coached the Red Skins to a 4–5 record. 

Doxie Moore regained the coaching reins after McDermott left to join the Tri-Cities Blackhawks, where he coached and played for the next season and a half, compiling a 20-18 record. On the Blackhawks, McDermott continued to be renowned for his physical play, and was tied for the team lead in scoring at 12.1 points per game with Whitey Von Nieda. That postseason, McDermott led the Blackhawks past the Indianapolis Kautskys in the opening round, before losing to the eventual champion Minneapolis Lakers in the semifinals. The following season, he was replaced as coach by Roger Potter halfway through the year.

McDermott would next play for the Hammond Calumet Buccaneers, during their only year of existence, and then the Wilkes-Barre Barons, both of whom would make the playoffs of their leagues before being eliminated in the first round. His final season playing professionally, during which he was again a player-coach, came with the Grand Rapids Hornets in 1950. McDermott was fired midseason after a profanity-filled coaching performance in Casper, Wyoming during which the Hornets lost, and the franchise folded only a month later. 

McDermott died in 1963, due to injuries he suffered in a car accident on September 23. He had been employed at Yonkers Raceway at the time of his death.

Accolades
McDermott was the World Professional Basketball Tournament MVP in 1944 and was named the NBL MVP in four consecutive seasons during the 1940s. In 1946 the NBL named McDermott the greatest player in league history. Collier's magazine chose him to an "All-World" team in 1950.

McDermott was named to the Naismith Memorial Basketball Hall of Fame in 1988.

Further reading

References

External links
Basketball Hall of Fame biography
Basketball-Reference.com: Bobby McDermott

1914 births
1963 deaths
American Basketball League (1925–1955) coaches
American men's basketball players
Basketball coaches from New York (state)
Basketball players from New York City
Chicago American Gears coaches
Chicago American Gears players
Fort Wayne Zollner Pistons coaches
Fort Wayne Zollner Pistons players
Guards (basketball)
Hammond Calumet Buccaneers players
Naismith Memorial Basketball Hall of Fame inductees
Original Celtics players
Player-coaches
Professional Basketball League of America players
Sheboygan Red Skins coaches
Sheboygan Red Skins players
Sportspeople from Queens, New York
Sportspeople from Yonkers, New York
Tri-Cities Blackhawks head coaches
Tri-Cities Blackhawks players
Wilkes-Barre Barons players